Cheran Chenkuttuvan  (c. 2nd century CE), literally 'the Alluring Kuttuvan Chera', identified with Katal Pirakottiya Vel Kezhu Kuttuvan (കടൽ പിറകോട്ടിയ വേൽക്കുഴുക്കുട്ടുവൻ), was the most celebrated Chera dynasty ruler of the early land of Kerala in early historic South India.

The Kuttuvan is eulogized by Paranar in the fifth decad of Patitrupattu of the Ettutokai anthology (early Sangham texts). The Kuttuvan successfully intervened in a succession dispute in the Chola country and established his relative on the Chola throne. The Kadambas ― helped by the Yavanas (perhaps Greek or Roman mariners) ― attacked the kuttuvan by sea, but the Chera ruler destroyed their fleet. He is said to have defeated the  Kongu people and a warrior called Mokur Mannan. Under his reign, the Chera territory included Kollimalai in the east and Vanchi, Karur, Tondi and Mantai on the western coast (Kerala). Kuttanadu in Kerala is after his name, which was one of his major capitals. The base of major ancient temples in land of Kerala was established by Cenguttuvan. He is being credited as the Creator of modern land of Kerala, on his actions on joining the various lands including western coast and southern parts of Western ghats speaking a common language and have similar lifestyle, culture and customs.

Military achievements of Cenkuttavan are described, albeit in an exaggerated manner, in the medieval Sangham epic poem Chilappatikaram. A method, known as Gajabahu Synchronism/Triple Synchronism, based on text proper, canto 30:160 of the epic, is used by scholars to date Cenkuttavan Chera to c. 2nd century CE.

Early texts 
The kuttuvan is eulogized by Paranar in the fifth decad of Patitrupattu of the Ettutokai anthology. Purananuru 343 refers to the hill products and sea products, mainly pearls, of Cenkuttuvan and to the Yavana gold that reached ashore by boats, in exchange.

The kuttuvan's mastery over the sea might have led to the often used title Katal Pirakottiya, which translates as "One who Lagged the Sea Behind".  Paranar praised the kuttuvan for his naval powers -

Paranar also praised kuttuvan's military prowess -

 Kuttuvan was the son of the Cera ruler Nedum Cheralathan and Nalconai (of the Cholas of Uraiyur). The wife of Cenkuttuvan was Illanko Venmal (the daughter of a Velir chief).
Cenkuttuvan ruled the Cera country for 55 years (Patitrupattu).
Warriors of the Kuttuvan used bull-hide shields to protect themselves from the enemy darts (Patitrupattu, 45).
 Kuttuvan successfully intervened in a succession dispute in the Cola territory and established his relative (brother-in-law) Killi on the Cola throne. The rivals of Killi were defeated in the battle of Nerivayil, Uraiyur (leading to the death of nine other contenders to the throne).
 The Kadambas are described as the arch enemies of the kuttuvan. The kuttuvan was able to defeat them in the battle of Idumbil, Valayur (Viyalur). The "fort" of Kotukur in which the Kadamba warriors took shelter was stormed. Later the Kadambas (helped by the Yavanas) attacked kuttuvan by sea, but the Cera ruler destroyed their fleet.
 Kuttuvan defeated the Kongu people and annexed Kongunadu to his kingdom. (Cilappatikaram, XXV, 152-53). Kuttuvan defeated a warrior called Pazhaiyan Mokur Mannan (one of the Cera's allies was Arukai, an enemy of the Mokurs) (Patitrupattu, 44 and49).  Kongunadu remained as an important part of Chera kingdom until it was detached to form Kongu Chera kingdom in later medieval period. Later this land was taken over by Pandyas.
The patikam to Patitrupattu, decad V mentions Ilango Adigal and the expedition of Cenkuttuvan to north India to bring a stone from which to carve the Pattini idol for protection of his kingdom(scholars are of the opinion that the patikam is a later interpolation to the text).

Cenguttavan Chera in  Chilappatikaram 
Authorship of Chilappatikaram is traditionally ascribed to prince Ilanko Atikal (literally the Junior Prince), who appears in the work as the younger brother of Cenkuttuvan Cera. The third part of Chilappatikaram (the Vanci Kantham) deals with Cenkuttuvan's expedition to bring the virakkallu from the Himalayas for an idol of Kannaki/Pattini.

According to the patikam of Chilappatikaram, the royal astrologer at the court of Cera king predicted that (the younger prince) Ilanko would succeed the king. Ilanko at once chose to renounce his claims to the throne and live a life of an Jain ascetic to make his brother Cenkuttuvan the king. He shifted to a monastery on the outskirts of Vanci, where he composed epic Chilappatikaram.

The Bhagavati Temple, in Kodungallur, Kerala, is claimed to be the Kannaki temple thus consecrated. Mangaladevi temple located in Idukki, Kerala is also said as the temple thus constructed by Kuttuvan.

Dating Cenguttavan Chera 
A method known as Gajabahu synchronism/Triple Synchronism is used by some scholars to date Cenkuttuvan Cera to 2nd century CE.

 According to Cilappatikaram (text proper, canto 30:160), severals neighbouring kings were invited by Cenkuttuvan to the installation of Kannaki-Pattini at Vanchi.
the Arya kings Kanaka and Vijaya
Kongu king of Kutaku
Kayavaku, the king of Lanka
Kayavaku,the king of Lanka is identified with Gajabahu I, king of Sri Lanka (r. c. 171/73 - 193 CE). In this context, Cenkuttuvan can be dated to either the first or last quarter of the 2nd century CE.
Despite its dependency on numerous conjectures, the method is considered as the sheet anchor for the purpose of dating the events in the early historic Tamil texts.

References

Bibliography
 

 

People of the Chera kingdom
3rd-century Indian Jains
Chera kings